Lamin-B1 is a protein that in humans is encoded by the LMNB1 gene.

The nuclear lamina consists of a two-dimensional matrix of proteins located next to the inner nuclear membrane. The lamin family of proteins make up the matrix and are highly conserved in evolution. During mitosis, the lamina matrix is reversibly disassembled as the lamin proteins are phosphorylated. Lamin proteins are thought to be involved in nuclear stability, chromatin structure, and gene expression. Vertebrate lamins consist of two types, A and B. This gene encodes one of the two B type proteins, B1.  Lamin B, along with heterochromatin, is anchored  to the inner surface of the nuclear membrane by the lamin B receptor.

Interactions
LMNB1 has been shown to interact with Thymopoietin.

Pathology

Mutations affecting the LMNB1 gene cause autosomal dominant adult-onset demyelinating leukodystrophy.

See also
 Lamin B2

References

Further reading